Strombus is the peer-reviewed scientific journal of the Conquiliologistas do Brasil (Conchologists of Brazil), covering research in malacology.

Abstracting and indexing 
The journal is abstracted and indexed by Aquatic Sciences and Fisheries Abstracts, ProQuest, Qualis CAPES, SCOPUS, The Zoological Record, Ulrich's Periodical Directory, CiteFactor and OAJI.

References

External links 

Malacology journals
Publications established in 1998
English-language journals
Biannual journals